James Patrick Kearney (4 July 1894 – 29 February 1944) was an Australian rules football player for Geelong and Richmond in the Victorian Football League (VFL) between 1915 and 1921. He captained Geelong in 1918 and 1919.

References

External links

1894 births
1944 deaths
Geelong Football Club players
Richmond Football Club players
Geelong West Football Club players
Australian rules footballers from Victoria (Australia)